Kənarmeşə (also, Kənarəmeşə and Kenaramesha) is a village and municipality in the Lankaran Rayon of Azerbaijan. It has a population of 1,413. The municipality consists of the villages of Kənarmeşə and Şilim.

References

External links 

Populated places in Lankaran District